The 1914–15 Army Cadets men's ice hockey season was the 12th season of play for the program.

Season
Army continued to rotate freshly graduated officers as the head coach of their hockey team. In 1914 Frank Purdon was given the job and, after a poor start, the team played well through most of the season. The Cadets lost most of their games but three were one-goal decisions. In their final game of the year, Army and Columbia played a 6-on-6 game rather than the standard 7-on-7 format.

Roster

Standings

Schedule and results

|-
!colspan=12 style=";" | Regular Season

References

Army Black Knights men's ice hockey seasons
Army
Army
Army
Army